Cookietown is a small unincorporated community in Cotton County, Oklahoma, United States.

History
Cookietown was named for a mercantile at the crossroads owned by Marvin Cornelius, circa 1928. The storeowner was noted for giving cookies to children.

References

Unincorporated communities in Cotton County, Oklahoma
Unincorporated communities in Oklahoma